The Owens Center is a multi-purpose ice arena and recreational facility located in Peoria, Illinois. The Owens Center is a part of the Peoria Park District. 

It is the home of the Peoria Mustangs of the North American 3 Hockey League (NA3HL), Robert Morris–Peoria Eagles men's hockey team of the American Collegiate Hockey Association (ACHA) and the Bradley Braves club hockey team. 
In addition to sports, the Owens Center is available for birthday parties, events, and public ice skating.

References

Indoor arenas in Illinois
Indoor ice hockey venues in Illinois
Robert Morris–Peoria Eagles
Sports venues in Peoria, Illinois